21 Laps Entertainment is a film and television production company founded and run by filmmaker Shawn Levy. The company is best known as the producers of Stranger Things, and exclusively distributes content through a partnership with Netflix. It has also produced films like Arrival, Free Guy, The Adam Project, Cheaper by the Dozen, The Spectacular Now, Real Steel, and the Night at the Museum franchise.

History 
In 1999, Shawn Levy, who after his start on television incorporated and founded the company as Wunjo, Inc. It was in-name only from the beginning until 2005. Levy made his breakout role as a film director on Big Fat Liar, Just Married, and Cheaper by the Dozen.

In 2003, Levy, after the success of his aforementioned feature films, launched his own production company with a first-look deal at 20th Century Fox Television. The deal was to produce half-hour sitcoms and hour-long dramas.

In 2005, Levy rebranded the studio to 21 Laps Entertainment and it signed a non-exclusive deal with 20th Century Fox to produce their films. The film division would be run by Tom McNulty, formerly employee from Happy Madison Productions, and its television division by J.J. Klein. The first two products were Cheaper by the Dozen 2 and Pepper Dennis.

In 2010, Levy and Marty Adelstein signed on to form a television company called 21 Laps/Adelstein Productions, and they signed a deal with 20th Century Fox Television and hired Becky Clements to serve as president.

In 2014, both Levy and Adelstein parted ways, with the latter launching Tomorrow Studios as a joint venture with ITV Studios.

One of the company's most recent television projects, Stranger Things, premiered on Netflix in July 2016 and achieved critical acclaim, earning a 95% on Rotten Tomatoes with 55 out of 58 reviews being positive. The show's first season was also one of Netflix's most watched series, averaging 14.07 million adults 18–49 in its first 35 days. Along with producing the series, Levy directed two of the premiere season's episodes. The third season premiered on July 4, 2019 and the fourth season premiered in two parts on May 27, 2022 and July 1, 2022. Also, it has recently been renewed for a fifth and final season. More recently, the company signed a first look deal with Netflix.

Filmography

Films

Television

References

American film studios
Television production companies of the United States